Justice League Heroes United is an arcade game based on the Justice League comic book.

References

2009 video games
Arcade video games
Arcade-only video games
Beat 'em ups
Batman video games
Superhero video games
Superman video games
Fighting games
Video games based on Justice League
Video games based on DC Comics
Video games developed in the United States
Video games set in the United States
Video games set on fictional planets